Cinq-Mars Handing his Sword to Louis XIII (French – Cinq-Mars rendant son épée à Louis XIII) is a c.1836–1837 painting by Claudius Jacquand. It is now held at the Royal Monastery of Brou, though it also appeared in the 2014 exhibition L'invention du passé. Histoires de cœur et d'épée en Europe, 1802–1850.

Sources
http://www.peintures-descours.fr/evenement/exposition-troubadour/

Paintings in Auvergne-Rhône-Alpes
1836 paintings
1837 paintings

History paintings
Cultural depictions of Louis XIII